FDI World Dental Federation notation (also "FDI notation" or "ISO 3950 notation") is the world's most commonly used dental notation (tooth numbering system). It is designated by the International Organization for Standardization as standard ISO 3950 "Dentistry — Designation system for teeth and areas of the oral cavity".

The system is developed by the FDI World Dental Federation. It is also used by the World Health Organization, and is used in most countries of the world except the United States (which uses the UNS).

Orientation of the chart is traditionally "dentist's view", i.e. patient's right corresponds to notation chart left.  The designations "left" and "right" on the chart below correspond to the patient's left and right.

Table of codes

Codes, names, and usual number of roots: (see chart of teeth at Universal Numbering System)

11 21 51 61 maxillary central incisor 1
41 31 81 71 mandibular central incisor 1
12 22 52 62 maxillary lateral incisor 1
42 32 82 72 mandibular lateral incisor 1
13 23 53 63 maxillary canine 1
43 33 83 73 mandibular canine 1
14 24 maxillary first premolar 2
44 34 mandibular first premolar 1
15 25 maxillary second premolar 1
45 35 mandibular second premolar 1
16 26 54 64 maxillary first molar 3
46 36 84 74 mandibular first molar 2
17 27 55 65 maxillary second molar 3
47 37 85 75 mandibular second molar 2
18 28 maxillary third molar 3
48 38 mandibular third molar 2

How the codes are constructed

Syntax: <quadrant code><tooth code>

Sometimes a dot is inserted between quadrant code and tooth code in order to avoid ambiguity with other numbering systems, especially the UNS.

Examples:
"13" = permanent upper right, 3rd tooth (canine)
"32" = permanent lower left, 2nd tooth (lateral incisor)

See also
 Dental notation
 Universal numbering system
 Palmer notation

References

External links
Dr.Bunn page on dental notations.
 https://www.youtube.com/watch?v=ea7lC42BVA8

.

ISO standards